Eibergen (Low Saxon: Eibarge) is a town and former municipality in Gelderland in the Eastern Netherlands. It is part of the Achterhoek cultural region. The administrative cooperation of about 20 municipalities in this region is the Regio Achterhoek.

On 1 January 2005 the municipality of Eibergen merged with the neighbouring municipalities of Neede, Borculo and Ruurlo into the new municipality of Berkelland. As of 2021, the town had a population of 11,210.

Population centres
 Avest
 Beltrum
 Eibergen
 Holterhoek
 Hupsel
 Lintvelde
 Loo
 Mallem
 Olden Eibergen
 Rekken
 Zwolle

The town of Eibergen
The town of Eibergen has a population of approximately 12,000 people. Its East boundary is the Dutch-German border and Eibergen used to count two official border crossing points on main roads and a small number of border crossing points for limited use on secondary roads. Since border crossing traffic became free and checks are only made inward at a certain distance from the actual border, the border has been 'perforated' by numerous (mostly bicycle) roads.

Because of this border past, a local annual indoor soccer tournament of Eibergen's police has grown to the world's largest sports event of its kind: the World Police Indoor Soccer Tournament. Held in October every year: more than 3,000 police officers from over 54 countries participate.

Government
It houses an interception station of the Nationale SIGINT Organisatie.

Monuments
The Mallumsche Molen is an old water mill, build in 1753. It lies on the Mallumsche Molenweg together with the Muldershuis and opens every Saturday to show how flour can be ground by the water mill.

In the centre of Eibergen is the De Scheper museum which displays objects from the history of Eibergen and the Achterhoek.

People born in Eibergen
 Willem Sluyter (1627-1673), vicar and writer
 Hendrik Odink (1889-1973), writer and local historian
 Menno ter Braak (1902-1940), author and polemicist
 Annie Borckink (born 1951), speed skater
 Astrid Bussink (born 1975), filmmaker
 Judith Pietersen (born 1989), volleyball player

References

External links

 Official website community Berkelland 

Municipalities of the Netherlands disestablished in 2005
Populated places in Gelderland
Former municipalities of Gelderland
Berkelland